Air Tungaru was the first airline of Kiribati.  As the predecessor of current Air Kiribati, it was Kiribati's national flag carrier. Air Tungaru's main base was the international airport at Kiribati's capital, South Tarawa. From there, regular service was provided to all 16 domestic airports in the Gilbert Islands.

According to its June 14, 1981 timetable, Air Tungaru initially operated a Boeing 727-100 jetliner with international service between Tarawa and Honolulu, Hawaii, United States via a stop on Kiritimati (listed as Christmas Island in the timetable) as well as nonstop service between Tarawa and the Tuvaluan capital Funafuti, the latter service being operated with a small de Havilland Heron prop aircraft.  This same timetable also lists nonstop service between Kiritimati (Christmas Island) and Papeete, Tahiti operated in association with Union de Transports Aériens (UTA), a French airline that was eventually merged into Air France.

Destinations

United States
 Hawaii
 Honolulu - Daniel K. Inouye International Airport

Oceania
Kiribati
Abaiang - Abaiang Airport
Abemama - Abemama Airport
Aranuka - Aranuka Airport
Arorae - Arorae Airport
Beru - Beru Airport
Butaritari - Butaritari Airport
Kiritimati (also known as Christmas Island) - Cassidy International Airport
Kuria - Kuria Airport
Maiana - Maiana Airport
Makin - Makin Airport
Marakei - Marakei Airport
Nikunau - Nikunau Airport
Nonouti - Nonouti Airport
Onotoa - Onotoa Airport
Tabiteuea North - Tabiteuea North Airport
Tabiteuea South - Tabiteuea South Airport
Tamana - Tamana Airport
Tarawa - Bonriki International Airport - Hub
Tuvalu
Funafuti - Funafuti International Airport
French Polynesia
Papeete, Tahiti - Faa'a International Airport - service operated in conjunction with Union de Transports Aeriens (UTA).

Fleet
Air Tungaru operated the following aircraft:

See also
List of defunct airlines of Kiribati

References

External links

Defunct airlines of Kiribati
Airlines established in 1977
Airlines disestablished in 1996